James Applewhite (born 1935 in Stantonsburg, North Carolina) is an American poet, and a retired Professor Emeritus in creative writing at Duke University.

He graduated from Duke University with a B.A., M.A. and Ph.D. 
His work appeared in Harper's.
His papers are held at Duke University.

He lives with his wife in Durham, North Carolina.

Awards
He is a 1976 Guggenheim Fellow. 
He won the 1998 Brockman-Campbell Award from the North Carolina Poetry Society. 
He won the Jean Stein Award in Poetry, by the American Academy of Arts and Letters. 
In 2008, he was inducted into the North Carolina Literary Hall of Fame.

Works
"Interstate Highway", poets.org

References

External links
"James Applewhite, Hearing 'Southern Voices'", NPR, September 25, 2005

Living people
Poets from North Carolina
Duke University faculty
1935 births
People from Stantonsburg, North Carolina
Writers from Durham, North Carolina